John Walter Woodbury (August 7, 1923 – November 29, 2017) was an American physiologist, author of the first textbook explanation of the Hodgkin-Huxley studies of the action potential, having been at University of Utah and University of Washington before being elected to the American Association for the Advancement of Science in 1952. He was a son of the biologist Angus M. Woodbury.

References

1923 births
2017 deaths
Fellows of the American Association for the Advancement of Science
21st-century American biologists
University of Utah faculty
University of Washington faculty